Stethaprion is a genus of characins fish from tropical South America.  The currently described species in this genus are:
 Stethaprion crenatum C. H. Eigenmann, 1916
 Stethaprion erythrops Cope, 1870

References
 

Characidae
Fish of South America
Taxa named by Edward Drinker Cope